Faraj Said Bin Ghanem (born 1937, died August 5, 2007) was the prime minister of Yemen from 17 May 1997 to 29 April 1998.

Early life and education 
Born in Ghail Bawazir, Hadramout Governorate, on December 1, 1937. He received his primary and medium education in Gail Bawazir and continued secondary education in Sudan. He got a bachelor's degree in economy from the University of Khartoum, Sudan, in 1964. Then he obtained a master's degree at the Central School of Planning and Statistics in Warsaw- Poland- in 1975. He had a doctorate in statistics from Poland in 1978.

References

1937 births
2007 deaths
Prime Ministers of Yemen
20th-century Yemeni politicians
People from Hadhramaut Governorate
20th-century prime ministers of Yemen
Attas Cabinet
Bin Ghanem Cabinet